The Boisavia B.50 Muscadet was a prototype French three-seat cabin monoplane first flown in 1946.

Design and operations
The B.50 was designed and built after the Second World War by Luicien Tieles, it was a strut-braced high-wing monoplane with three seats and a conventional landing gear with a tail wheel. The prototype, with the French test registration F-WCZE, first flew on 13 October 1946 powered by a  Renault 4Pei engine. Tieles modified the design as a four-seater and formed Societe Boisavia to build the type which he called the Mercurey.

Specifications

References

 
 
 

Muscadet
1940s French civil utility aircraft
Single-engined tractor aircraft
High-wing aircraft
Aircraft first flown in 1946